Columbia Business School (CBS) is the business school of Columbia University, a private research university in New York City. Established in 1916, Columbia Business School is one of six Ivy League business schools and is one of the oldest business schools in the world. Although it originally offered undergraduate degrees, it stopped doing so in the middle of the twentieth century and now only offers graduate degrees and professional programs.

History

The school was founded in 1916 with 11 full-time faculty members and an inaugural class of 61 students, including 8 women. Banking executive Emerson McMillin provided initial funding in 1916, while A. Barton Hepburn, then president of Chase National Bank, provided funding for the school's endowment in 1919. The school expanded rapidly, enrolling 420 students by 1920, and in 1924 added a PhD program to the existing BS and MS degree programs.

In 1945, Columbia Business School authorized the awarding of the MBA degree. Shortly thereafter, in the 1950s, the school adopted the Hermes emblem as its symbol, reflecting the entrepreneurial nature of the Greek god Hermes and his association with business, commerce, and communication.

In 1952, CBS admitted its last class of undergraduates. The school currently offers executive education programs that culminate in a Certificate in Business Excellence (CIBE) and full alumni status, and several degree programs for the MBA and PhD degrees. In addition to the full-time MBA, the school offers four Executive MBA programs: the NY-EMBA Friday/Saturday program, the EMBA-Global program (launched in 2001 in conjunction with the London Business School), the EMBA-Americas program launched in 2012, and the EMBA-Global Asia program (launched in 2009 in conjunction with the London Business School and the University of Hong Kong Business School). Students in jointly run programs earn an MBA degree from each of the cooperating institutions.

In 2004, economist R. Glenn Hubbard became Columbia Business School's eleventh dean. He was succeeded in 2019 by Costis Maglaras.

Campus
From 1961, Columbia Business School was primarily located housed in Uris Hall, at the center of Columbia's Morningside Heights campus.

In October 2010, Columbia Business School announced that alumnus Henry Kravis, the billionaire co-founder of private-equity firm Kohlberg Kravis Roberts (KKR & Co.), pledged $100 million to fund an expansion of Columbia Business School, the largest gift in its history. The donation went toward construction of the business school's new site on Columbia's Manhattanville campus. In December 2012, Ronald Perelman also donated $100 million to the construction of the second business school building. In September 2021, David Geffen pledged $75 million to support the new campus' construction. The buildings are designed by Diller Scofidio + Renfro, and are named Henry R. Kravis Hall and David Geffen Hall, respectively. Columbia Business School officially moved to Manhattanville in January 2022.

The cost of the new campus, which stands at $600 million, makes it the most expensive business school ever built.

MBA program
The Columbia MBA Program is one of the most competitive in the world with an admission rate of 13.6% for the 2021 entering class. The student body is highly accomplished and diverse. Students in the class that entered in 2009 come from 61 countries and speak more than 50 languages.

The revised core curriculum, launched in the fall of 2008, represents about 40% of the degree requirement. It consists of 2 full courses and 12 half-term courses including Corporate Finance, Financial Accounting, Managerial Statistics, Managerial Economics, Leadership, Operations Management, and Marketing Strategy. While the first year of the program is usually devoted to completing the requirements of the core curriculum, the second year provides students with the opportunity to choose from the more than 130 elective courses available at the School and supplement them with more than 4,000 graduate-level classes from the University's other graduate and professional schools. Among the most popular electives at Columbia Business School are the Economics of Strategic Behavior, Financial Statement Analysis and Earnings Quality, Launching New Ventures, Modern Political Economy, and the Seminar in Value Investing.

Columbia Business School has a firm grade non-disclosure policy, stating that students refrain from disclosing specific class grades, GPAs, or transcripts until they accept full-time, post graduation positions. Students enter Columbia's MBA program in two tracks.  The traditional fall term is approximately 550 students, while the January term "J-Term" is approximately 200 students.  Students entering in the fall are divided into eight clusters of approximately 65 students that take all first year core classes together. J-Term students are broken into three clusters.  The J-Term is aimed at students who want an accelerated 18-month program who usually plan to return to their previous job, are company sponsored, and will not pursue a summer internship because they take classes during the summer.

The average starting base salary and bonus for Columbia MBAs in 2020 was $171,436, a sum that places it as the 6th highest among business schools. According to Forbes magazine, 90% of billionaires with MBAs who derived their fortunes from finance obtained their master's degree from one of three schools: Harvard Business School, Columbia Business School, or The Wharton School at the University of Pennsylvania.

Academic divisions
The school's faculty are divided into six academic units:
Accounting
Decision, Risk, and Operations
Finance
Management
Economics
Marketing

MBA rankings

Recent national rankings of Columbia's MBA program include 7th by Forbes, 6th by Bloomberg Businessweek, and 6th by U.S. News & World Report. In global rankings, Columbia was ranked No. 4 by The Economist in 2022 and No. 1 by the Financial Times in 2023.

Dual-degree programs
Columbia Business School students can combine an MBA with one of ten other professional degrees.  In general, a dual degree requires one less year than it would take to complete the two degrees separately. Candidates must apply separately to Columbia Business School and the other degree program.

Dual degrees offered with the following schools include:

 School of Architecture, Planning and Preservation
 College of Dental Medicine
 School of Engineering and Applied Science
 School of International and Public Affairs
 School of Journalism
 School of Law
 School of Nursing
 College of Physicians and Surgeons
 School of Public Health
 School of Social Work

Student life 
The Columbia Business School Follies is a student club that works throughout each semester to put together a production in which students write, choreograph, and perform comedy skits. It achieved notoriety in 2006 for "Every Breath Bernanke Takes", its video parody of the Police song "Every Breath You Take". It purports to be from Glenn Hubbard, Dean of the Business School, in response to Hubbard's being a runner-up to the Fed Chairmanship assumed by Ben Bernanke.

Executive MBA programs
Columbia offers various executive MBA programs.

The Executive MBA (EMBA) Friday/Saturday Program is a 20-month graduate program designed for individuals that are looking to enhance their education without interrupting their careers. The EMBA program is taught on campus at Columbia University by full-time faculty. The first year of classes consists of the same core curriculum as the Full-Time MBA program. Executive education is the focus of the second year.  This Friday/Saturday program is targeted at individuals with approximately 10 years of work experience.

The Executive MBA (EMBA) Saturday Program is a 24-month graduate degree program designed for individuals that are looking to enhance their education, but cannot take any time away from work.  This program is the same as the Friday/Saturday program, with the exception that classes only meet on Saturdays over a longer period of time.

In addition to the New York-based EMBA Program, Columbia offers three partner programs to meet the differing needs and geographical distribution of prospective students. Because students in the partner EMBA programs must satisfy the separate requirements of each school, they earn an MBA degree from each participating university. Likewise, they become alumni of each university and business school and may avail themselves of all programs and privileges afforded to alumni.

The EMBA-Global Americas & Europe program is a 20-month program administered in partnership with the London Business School. The program enrolls approximately 70 students from around the world per year. Courses are taught by the full-time faculty of both schools. During the first year, the core curriculum classes alternate monthly between the campuses of Columbia University and the London Business School. The core curriculum is similar to that offered in the regular EMBA programs offered separately by each school, but with a more transnational-business emphasis. Second year classes may be selected from the portfolio of EMBA classes offered at either or both partner schools.
The EMBA-Global Asia, run jointly with the London Business School and the University of Hong Kong. This 20-month program follows a curriculum similar to the EMBA-Global program. Classes are held in Hong Kong, London, New York, and Shanghai.

EMBA rankings
 No. 2 worldwide, No. 2 US program, BusinessWeek, 2011 Executive MBA Rankings
 No. 2 worldwide, Financial Times, 2010 Executive MBA Rankings, Global-EMBA program
 No. 3 US Program, No. 13 worldwide. Financial Times, 2010 Executive MBA Rankings, Berkeley-Columbia program
 No. 4 US Program, No. 15 worldwide. Financial Times, 2010 Executive MBA Rankings, NY-EMBA program
 No. 5 U.S. News & World Report 2010 Rankings
 No. 4 BusinessWeek Executive MBA Rankings, NY-EMBA program
 No. 9 Wall Street Journal Executive MBA Rankings, 2010, NY-EMBA program

MS Programs
Columbia Business School offers three separate Master of Science degrees in Accounting and Fundamental Analysis, Financial Economics and Marketing. Admission to the programs is extremely competitive: in 2021, there were 837 applicants to the Financial Economics program and only 20 students were accepted.

Doctoral program
The degree of Doctor of Philosophy (PhD) is offered by the Graduate School of Arts and Sciences and is administered by the Business School.  Admission is highly competitive with 894 applicants in 2010 for positions in an entering class of 18 students (2%). In 2021, the Finance division received over 500 applications and admitted 3 students (Acceptance rate of 0.6%) A PhD in Management or Business is a common precursor to an academic career in business schools.

Executive education
Columbia Business School Executive Education offers custom non-degree programs for organizations and open-enrollment non-degree programs for individuals in topics including management, finance, leadership, marketing, social enterprise, and strategy. The school also offers executive certification programs, including the Advanced Management Program, the Certificate in Business Excellence and the Senior Leaders Program for Nonprofit Professionals.

CIBE
The Certificate in Business Excellence (CIBE) is awarded to students who complete a total of 18 program days of executive education within a four-year period. Any executive education program at Columbia Business School can be applied toward the completion of the certificate.

Research centers, programs, and institutes
Research centers, special programs, institutes, and cross-disciplinary areas at Columbia Business School include:

Arthur J. Samberg Institute for Teaching Excellence
The Behavioral Lab
The Center for Decision Sciences
Center for Excellence in Accounting and Security Analysis
Center on Global Brand Leadership
Center on Japanese Economy and Business
Columbia Institute for Tele-Information
Columbia University Center for International Business Education Research
Competitive Strategy
Decision Making and Negotiations
Eugene Lang Center for Entrepreneurship
Healthcare and Pharmaceutical Management Program
The Heilbrunn Center for Graham & Dodd Investing
Jerome A. Chazen Institute of International Business
The Media Program
The Paul Milstein Center for Real Estate
Private Equity Program
Program for Financial Studies
Program on Social Intelligence
Richard Paul Richman Center for Business, Law, and Public Policy
The Sanford C. Bernstein & Co. Center for Leadership and Ethics
The Social Enterprise Program
W. Edwards Deming Center for Quality, Productivity and Competitiveness

People

Faculty
Columbia Business School employs 136 full-time faculty members, including Joseph Stiglitz, the 2001 Nobel laureate in economics who also teaches at the university's School of International and Public Affairs; and Bernd Schmitt, the Robert D. Calkins Professor of International Business. The current Dean is the former Presidential Council of Economic Advisors Chairman Glenn Hubbard. Hedge fund gurus Joel Greenblatt and Ken Shubin Stein are currently adjunct professors. Bruce Greenwald teaches Value Investing and Economics of Strategic Behavior electives. Adam Dell, brother of Dell Inc. CEO Michael Dell, is a venture capitalist who teaches Business Innovation and Technology. Jonathan Knee teaches Media, Mergers, and Acquisitions and is the author of a book titled "The Accidental Investment Banker". Frederic Mishkin, member of the Board of Governors of the Federal Reserve System, returned to teach at CBS starting fall 2008. Rita Gunther McGrath is a well known member of the strategy faculty and the author of four books on the subject, most recently The End of Competitive Advantage: How to Keep Your Strategy Moving as Fast As Your Business (2013, Harvard Business Review Publishing) Steve Blank created the Lean Launchpad class that he teaches a scientific method for teaching entrepreneurship that combines experiential learning with the three building blocks of a successful Lean Startup.

Alumni
Columbia Business School has over 44,000 living alumni. Some of the more notable alumni include the following:

 Akinlabi Olasunkanmi, MBA, Nigerian Senator and Federal Minister of Youth Development
 Alan Patricof, MBA 1957, Founder of Apax Partners
 Alexander Haig, MBA 1955, United States Secretary of State
 Alfred P. Thorne, PhD 1959, British Guiana-born development economist
 Anna Rawson, MBA 2015, Australian professional golfer and model 
 Antony Ressler, MBA 1985, co-founder of the private equity firm Apollo Global Management and Ares Management 
 António Pedro dos Santos Simões, MBA, CEO of HSBC UK 
 Arthur Burns, PhD 1934, Chairman of the Federal Reserve
 Arthur J. Samberg, MBA 1967, Chairman and CEO of Pequot Capital
 Artie Minson, MBA 1997, former CEO of WeWork 
 Azita Raji, MBA 1991, former United States ambassador to Sweden
 Benjamin M. Rosen, MBA 1961, Former chairman and CEO of Compaq
 Benjamin Wey, MSLD 2013, Chinese-born American Wall Street financier and CEO of New York Global Group
 Beth Ford, MBA 1995, CEO of Land O'Lakes
 Beverly Leon, MBA 2020, former midfielder for Sunderland A.F.C. Ladies
 Bill Keenan, MBA 2016, former professional hockey player and author
 Blair Effron, MBA 1986, Founder of Centerview Partners
 Robert Kasten Jr., MBA 1966, U.S. Senator from Wisconsin 1981 to 1993.
 Charles E. Exley Jr., MBA 1954, Former chairman and CEO of NCR Corporation
 Charles R. Perrin, MBA 1969, Chairman of Warnaco; Former CEO of Duracell, Former CEO of Avon Products
 Cherie Nursalim, MBA 1990, Indonesian businesswoman, Vice Chairman of Giti Group
 Christopher O'Neill, MBA 2005, British-American businessman and husband of Princess Madeleine of Sweden
 Claude Arpels, MBA 1998, director of Van Cleef & Arpels
 Cyrus Massoumi, MBA 2003, founder of Zocdoc
 César Alierta, MBA 1970, CEO of Telefónica
 Daniele Bodini, MBA 1972, Italian real estate businessman, Ambassador of San Marino to the United Nations
 David C. Schmittlein, PhD 1980, Dean of MIT (Sloan)
 David LeFevre Dodd, MS 1921, PhD 1930, Father of value investing
 David Philbrick Conner, MBA 1976, CEO of Oversea-Chinese Banking Corporation
 David S. Rose, MBA 1983, American entrepreneur, founder of New York Angels
 David Sainsbury, MBA 1971, Former Chairman of Sainsbury's
 David E. Simon, MBA 1985, Chairman and CEO of Simon Property Group
 Diana Taylor, MBA 1980, 42nd Superintendent of the New York State Banking Department; domestic partner of former mayor Michael Bloomberg
 Donna Rosato, MBA 2000, journalist, reporter for Money Magazine
 Donald S. Siegel, PhD 1988, professor at Arizona State University
 Douglas Hsu, MBA 1968, billionaire chairman of Far Eastern Group 
 Édouard Carmignac, MBA 1972, French investment banker and fund manager 
 Eduardo Verano De la Rosa, MBA 1978, Colombian Governor of Atlántico
 Elle Kaplan, MBA 2005, Founder and CEO of LexION Capital Management
 Emilio Lozoya, MBA 1972, Secretary of Energy of Mexico; father of Pemex CEO Emilio Lozoya Austin
 Eric Fromm (born 1958), tennis player
 Ernest Higa, MBA 1976, Japanese-American entrepreneur
 Erskine Bowles, MBA 1969, Former White House Chief of Staff; President of the University of North Carolina system
 Ethan Brown, MBA 2008, founder of Beyond Meat
 Eudora Welty, MBA 1932, American author, winner of the Pulitzer Prize in 1973; recipient of the Presidential Medal of Freedom
 Eugene Lang, MS 1940, Chairman of the Eugene M. Lang Foundation
 Federico Marchetti, MBA 1999, founder of online retailer YOOX Group
 Frank Lautenberg, BS 1949, U.S. Senator from New Jersey
 Fred Hochberg, MBA 1975, Chairman and President of the Export–Import Bank of the United States
 Gabriele Galateri di Genola, MBA 1972, Chairman of Assicurazioni Generali, former Chairman of Telecom Italia and CEO of Fiat
 Gail J. McGovern, EMBA 1987, CEO of the American Red Cross
 Gen Fukunaga, MBA 1989, Founder and CEO of Funimation Entertainment
 Gerri Willis, MBA, news journalist for Fox Business Network
 Hanzade Doğan Boyner, MBA 1999, vice-chairwoman of Doğan Holding and daughter of Turkish billionaire Aydın Doğan
 Harvey Schwartz, MBA 1996, president and COO of Goldman Sachs
 Henry Kravis, MBA 1969, Founder of Kohlberg Kravis Roberts & Co.
 Henry Swieca, MBA 1982, Co-Founder of Highbridge Capital Management, Founder of Talpion
 Howard L. Clark Jr., MBA 1968, Chairman and CEO of Shearson Lehman Brothers
 Ian Plenderleith, MBA 1971, Former Deputy Governor, South African Reserve Bank
 Ira Trivedi, MBA 2008, Indian novelist, yoga teacher, and entrepreneur
 Irvine Laidlaw, Baron Laidlaw, MBA 1965, Scottish businessman and member of the House of Lords
 Irving Kahn, MBA, oldest living active investment professional
 J.T. Battenberg, CEO of Delphi Automotive Systems
 Jay W. Jordan II, MBA, founder of the Jordan Company
 James P. Gorman, MBA 1987, Chairman and CEO of Morgan Stanley
 James W. Keyes, MBA 1980, CEO of Fresh & Easy and former chairman and CEO of Blockbuster Inc., 7-Eleven
 James Satloff, MBA 1986, former CEO of C.E. Unterberg, Towbin, founder of Liberty Skis
 Jamie Kern, MBA 2004, co-founder and CEO of It Cosmetics
 Mehmet Omer Koç, MBA 1989, Chairman of Koç Holding
 Jean-Marc Perraud, MBA 1972, Former CFO of Schlumberger
 Jean-Paul Elkann, BS 1943, Director of Dior, son-in-law of Fiat Chairman Gianni Agnelli
 Jeff Campbell, MBA 1967 Former chairman and CEO of Burger King
 Jeffrey Loria, MBA 1968, Owner of the Florida Marlins
 Jerome Chazen, MBA 1950, Co-founder of Liz Claiborne
 Jerome J. Workman Jr., CSEP 2004, CIED 2004, CIBE 2006, prolific author, inventor, and editor of scientific reference works on the subject of spectroscopy; and a noted analytical spectroscopist.
 Jerry Speyer, MBA 1964, CEO of Tishman Speyer Properties
 Jill Furman, MBA 1997, co-producer of musical Hamilton
 Joan Hornig, MBA 1983, jewelry designer 
 Joern Meissner, PhD 2005, professor at Kühne Logistics University; founder of test-prep company Manhattan Review
 John T. Dillon, MBA 1971, Chairman and CEO of International Paper
 John H. Shen-Sampas, MBA 2013, chief literary executor for the estate of Jack Kerouac
 Jon Stein, MBA 2009, Founder and CEO of Betterment
 Jon Steinberg, MBA 2003, President of BuzzFeed
 Jordan Roth, MBA 2010, president and majority owner of Jujamcyn Theaters
 Joseph M. Tucci, MBA 1984, President and CEO of EMC Corporation
 Joseph Vittoria, MBA 1959, Former chairman and CEO of Avis
 Joshua Mitts, PhD 2018, Columbia Law School professor known for research into activist short-selling
 Joyce M. Roche, MBA 1972, former CEO of Girls, Inc. and director of AT&T
 Julian Geiger, MBA, Former chairman and CEO of Aeropostal
 Kate Wang, MBA 2013, Chinese billionaire businesswoman
 Keiko Sofia Fujimori, MBA 2008, Peruvian politician.
 Keith Sherin, EMBA 1991, Chairman and CEO of GE Capital
 Kenneth Ouriel, MBA 2009, Former CEO of Shaikh Khalifa Medical City in Abu Dhabi, United Arab Emirates; vascular surgeon
 Kevin Burke, MBA, Chairman and CEO of Consolidated Edison
 Koos Bekker, MBA 1984, Chairman of South Africa-based multinational mass media company Naspers
 Leon G. Cooperman, MBA 1967, Founder, Chairman, and CEO of Omega Advisors
 Leonard Lauder, MBA 1955, Chairman emeritus of the Estée Lauder Companies; son of Estée Lauder
 Lewis A. Sanders, MBA 1995, former chairman and CEO of AllianceBernstein
 Lewis Frankfort, MBA 1969, Chairman and CEO of Coach
 Li Lu, MBA 1996, Chinese-American investment banker, fund manager, and investor; one of the student leaders of the Tiananmen Square student protests of 1989
 Lionel Pincus, MBA 1956, Founder and Chairman of Warburg Pincus
 Lorne Abony, MBA 2003, owner of the Austin Aces; former CEO of Mood Media
 Louis Bacon, MBA 1981, Chairman of Moore Capital Management
 Louis Rossetto, MBA 1973, Founder and Editor-in-Chief of Wired Magazine
 Lynn Tilton, MBA 1987, businesswoman; Collateralized loan obligation creator, owner, and manager; owner of Patriarch Partners, largest woman-owned business in the United States 
 Mark T. Cox IV, MBA 1971, former United States alternate executive director to the World Bank 
 Mario Gabelli, MBA 1967, Chairman and CEO of GAMCO
 Mark Gallogly, MBA 1986, Founder of Centerbridge Partners
 Mark Mays, MBA 1989, President and CEO of Clear Channel Communications
 Mark Reckless, MBA 1999, UK Independence Party politician; Member of parliament for Rochester and Strood
 Martin Kihn, MBA 2001, writer and digital marketer
 Martín Varsavsky, MBA 1985, Argentine/Spanish serial entrepreneur, founder of Jazztel, Ya.com and Fon
 Matt Pincus, MBA 2002, founder and CEO of Songs Music Publishing, son of Lionel Pincus
 Mauricio García Araujo, MBA, president of the Central Bank of Venezuela from 1987 
 Max C. Chapman, MBA, Former President and CEO of Kidder, Peabody & Co.
 Mel Immergut, MBA, former chairman of international law firm Milbank, Tweed, Hadley & McCloy
 Meyer Feldberg, MBA 1965, former president of the Illinois Institute of Technology and dean of Columbia Business School
 Michael A. Peel, MBA 1983, Former VP of Human Resources at Yale University and Fellow of The National Academy of Human Resources.
 Michael Bellavia, MBA 1999, CEO of Animax Entertainment
 Michael Goodkin, MBA 1968, Quantitative finance entrepreneur, founder of Arbitrage Management Company and Numerix
 Michael Gould, MBA 1968, Chairman and CEO of Bloomingdale's
 Mike Fries, MBA, CEO, Vice-Chairman of Liberty Global
 Mike Jeffries, MBA 1968, CEO of Abercrombie and Fitch
 Mitch Albom, MBA 1983, American best-selling author, journalist, screenwriter, Tuesdays with Morrie, The Five People You Meet in Heaven
 N. Robert Hammer, MBA, Chairman and CEO of CommVault Systems
 Nancy McKinstry, MB 1984, CEO and Chairman of the Executive Board of Wolters Kluwer
 Noor Pahlavi, MBA 2020, model, socialite and princess to the former throne of Iran
 Patrick Stokes, MBA 1966, Former chairman and CEO of Anheuser-Busch
 Paul B. Kazarian, MBA 1981, Founder, Chairman, and CEO of Japonica Partners
 Paul Calello, MBA 1987, Chairman and CEO of Credit Suisse's investment banking division 
 Paul Montrone, PhD 1996, Chairman and CEO of Fisher Scientific
 Penny Chenery, MBA, American sportswoman who bred and raced Secretariat, 1973 winner of the Triple Crown
 Percy Uris, BS 1920, American real estate developer and namesake of Uris Hall, the business school building of Columbia
 Peter A. Cohen, MBA 1969, Chairman and CEO of Shearson Lehman Brothers
 Peter Woo, MBA 1972, Chairman of Hong Kong Trade and Development Council, Wheelock & Co, and The Wharf Holdings Limited
 Philip Geier, MBA 1958, Former chairman and CEO of Interpublic Group of Companies
 Philip J. K. James, MBA 2005, founding CEO of Lot18 and Snooth
 Philippe Jabre, MBA 1982, CEO of Jabre Capital Partners
 Prince Amedeo of Belgium, Archduke of Austria-Este, MBA 2014, member of the Belgian Royal Family 
 Rachel Jacobs, MBA 2002, CEO of ApprenNet killed in the 2015 Philadelphia train derailment
 Robert Agostinelli, MBA 1981, Founder of Rhône Group
 Robert Amen, MBA 1973, Chairman and CEO of International Flavors and Fragrances
 Robert Bakish, MBA 1989, President and CEO of Viacom
 Robert Daniel, MBA, United States Congressman from Virginia
 Robert F. Smith, MBA 1994, founder of Vista Equity Partners, wealthiest African-American 
 Robert J. Stevens, MBA 1987, Chairman and CEO of Lockheed Martin
 Robert K. Watson, MBA 2006, Founder of LEED
 Robert R. Bennett, MBA 1982, CEO of Liberty Media Corporation
 Robert Reffkin, MBA 2003, founder and CEO of Compass Inc.
 Rocco B. Commisso, MBA 1975, Chairman and CEO of Mediacom
 Rochelle Lazarus, MBA 1970, Chairman and CEO of Ogilvy & Mather
 Rohit Aggarwala, MBA 2000, Commissioner of the New York City Department of Environmental Protection
 Ronald Grant, MBA 1993, Former President and COO of AOL LLC
 Roy Den Hollander, MBA 1997, lawyer and murder suspect
 Russell Carson, MBA 1967, Founder of Welsh, Carson, Anderson & Stowe
 Sallie Krawcheck, MBA 1992, CEO and co-founder, Ellevest, former chairman and CEO Sanford Bernstein, former CEO Citigroup Global Wealth Management
 Sanford Greenberg, MBA 1966, Chairman of Johns Hopkins University's Wilmer Eye Institute
 Seungpil Yu, MBA 1971, PhD 1979, Chairman and CEO of Yuyu Pharma (South Korea)
 Shin Dong-bin (Akio Shigemitsu), MBA 1980, Billionaire Chairman of Lotte Group
 Shirley Wang, MBA 1993, CEO of Plastpro, Inc., daughter-in-law of Wang Yung-ching
 Sidney Taurel, MBA 1971, Chairman and CEO of Eli Lilly and Company
 Srikumar Rao, PhD 1980, speaker, author, creator of Creativity and Personal Mastery (CPM) course
 Stephanie Korey, MBA, founder and CEO of Away (luggage)
 Thomas Sandell, MBA 1989, Swedish billionaire hedge fund manager
 Timothy Kopra, MBA 2013, NASA astronaut
 Todd Combs, MBA 2002, hedge fund manager, tapped as a potential successor of Warren Buffett as CIO of Berkshire Hathaway
 Tos Chirathivat, MBA 1988, CEO of Central Group
 Tracey Chang, MBA 2011, China Central Television anchor; Miss New York USA in 2009
 Tshilidzi Marwala, AMP 2017, Vice-Chancellor and Principal of the University of Johannesburg
 Umayya Toukan, PhD 1987, Governor of the Central Bank of Jordan
 Valerie Mars, MBA, American billionaire heiress, daughter of Forrest Mars Jr.
 Vikram Pandit, MBA 1980, PhD 1986, CEO of Citigroup
 Vincent Sardi Jr., BS 1937, owner of Sardi's Restaurant
 Walter E. Hussman Jr., MBA 1970, CEO of WEHCO Media and publisher of the Arkansas Democrat-Gazette
 Warren Buffett, MS 1951, CEO of Berkshire Hathaway
 Washington SyCip, MBA 1943, founder of the Asian Institute of Management and Sycip Gorres Velayo & Co.
 William von Mueffling, MBA 1995, President of Cantillon Capital Management
 Wolfgang Bernhard, MBA 1988, Member of the Board of Management of Daimler AG
 Xavier R. Rolet, MBA 1984, Former CEO of the London Stock Exchange
 Yuzaburo Mogi, MBA 1961, Chairman and CEO of Kikkoman

References

External links
Official website

 
Columbia University
Ivy League business schools
Business schools in New York (state)
Universities and colleges in New York City
Educational institutions established in 1916
Universities and colleges in Manhattan
1916 establishments in New York City